Muckle Flugga lighthouse punctuates the rocky stack of Muckle Flugga, in Shetland, Scotland. Originally called North Unst Lighthouse, it was renamed in 1964.

The brothers Thomas and David Stevenson designed and built the lighthouse in 1854, originally to protect ships during the Crimean War. In March 1995 it was fully automated. Thomas's son Robert Louis Stevenson, the writer, visited it as a young man. As a result, Unst became his inspiration for the map of "Treasure Island". The lighthouse was served by the Grace Darling which was launched from the boat house below the lighthouse shore station in Burrafirth. Supplies were winched up by the blondin cable hoist to the courtyard, from the boat in a natural cleft of the rocks that provides a degree of harbourage.

This lighthouse was also used as a setting for the wartime comedy Back-Room Boy.

History
In 1851 it was decided to build a lighthouse on north Unst but, because of difficulties in determining the exact location, nothing had been done by the start of 1854. During the Crimean War, the government urged the commissioners to set up a light on Muckle Flugga to protect Her Majesty's ships. It was thought to be high and safe enough to withstand the elements, but when winter storms began waves broke heavily on the tower and burst open the door to the living quarters. The principal keeper reported that  of stone dyke had been broken down, and the keepers had no dry place to sit or sleep. Plans were made for a higher and more permanent lighthouse, but there were still disagreements about where to locate it, Muckle Flugga or Lamba Ness. The orders to start the work on the new Muckle Flugga tower were finally given in June 1855. The lighthouse's original name was "North Unst", but in 1964 that was changed to "Muckle Flugga".

Lighthouse keepers
Russell Powell 1977–1990
Thomas J. M. Hutchison 1949–1962

Muckle Flugga Shore Station
Muckle Flugga was one of the few lighthouses in Scotland which had a separate shore station that served as accommodation for the lighthouse keepers when they were off duty (similar to Sule Skerry and its shore station in Stromness, Orkney). The shore station was sold off when the lighthouse was automated. Part of the building now hosts the Hermaness Visitor Centre at the entrance to the neighbouring Hermaness National Nature Reserve, which is managed by NatureScot.

See also

 List of lighthouses in Scotland
 List of Northern Lighthouse Board lighthouses
 List of Category A listed buildings in Shetland

References

Bibliography

External links

Muckle Flugga Lighthouse
 Northern Lighthouse Board 
Lighthouse Explorer

Lighthouses completed in 1854
Lighthouses in Shetland
Category A listed buildings in Shetland
Category A listed lighthouses
Unst
1854 establishments in Scotland